('right of blood') is a principle of nationality law by which citizenship is determined or acquired by the nationality or ethnicity of one or both parents. Children at birth may be citizens of a particular state if either or both of their parents have citizenship of that state. It may also apply to national identities of ethnic, cultural, or other origins. Citizenship can also apply to children whose parents belong to a diaspora and were not themselves citizens of the state conferring citizenship. This principle contrasts with jus soli ('right of soil'), which is solely based on the place of birth.

Today, almost all states apply some combination of jus soli and jus sanguinis in their nationality laws to varying degrees. Historically, the most common application of jus sanguinis is a right of a child to their father's nationality. Today, the vast majority of countries extend this right on an equal basis to the mother. Some apply this right irrespective of the place of birth, while others may limit it to those born in the state. Some countries provide that a child acquires the nationality of the mother if the father is unknown or stateless, and some irrespective of the place of birth. Some such children may acquire the nationality automatically while others may need to apply for a parent's nationality.

Modern development
At the end of the 19th century, the French-German debate on nationality saw the French, such as Ernest Renan, oppose the German conception, exemplified by Johann Fichte, who believed in an "objective nationality", based on blood, race or language. Renan's republican conception, but perhaps also the presence of a German-speaking population in Alsace-Lorraine, explains France's early adoption of jus soli.

Mixed standards
Many nations have a mixture of jus sanguinis and jus soli, including the United States, Canada, Israel, Greece, the Republic of Ireland, and recently Germany. Today French nationality law narrowly applies jus sanguinis, but it is still the most common means of passing on citizenship in many continental European nations.

Complications due to imposed boundaries
Some modern European states which arose out of the dissolved Austro-Hungarian or Ottoman empires have huge numbers of ethnic populations outside of their new 'national' boundaries, as do most of the former Soviet states. Such long-standing diasporas do not conform to codified 20th-century European rules of citizenship.

In many cases, jus sanguinis rights are mandated by international treaty, with citizenship definition imposed by the national and international community. In other cases, minorities are subject to legal and extra-legal persecution and choose to immigrate to their ancestral home country. States offering jus sanguinis rights to ethnic citizens and their descendants include Italy, Greece, Turkey, Bulgaria, Lebanon, Armenia, Hungary and Romania. Each is required by international treaty to extend those rights.

Current Jus sanguinis states

Africa

North America

South America

Asia

Europe

Current Leges sanguinis states
Many countries provide citizenship on preferential terms to individuals with ethnic ties to these countries (so-called leges sanguinis).

See also 

Blood quantum laws
Bumiputra
Diaspora politics
Indigenous rights
Jus soli
Nativism (politics)
Opposition to immigration
Repatriation laws
Right of return
Hereditary title

References

Bibliography
 

Human migration
Legal rules with Latin names

Citizenship
Birthplaces
Anti-immigration politics